Strupina  is a village (former town) in the administrative district of Gmina Prusice, within Trzebnica County, Lower Silesian Voivodeship, in south-western Poland. Prior to 1945 it was in Germany.

The village has a population of 450.

References

External links

Strupina
Former populated places in Lower Silesian Voivodeship